Dumile may refer to:

 Daniel Dumile (1971–2020), British rapper with stage name MF Doom
 Dumile Feni (1942–1991), South African contemporary visual artist